The Seebach is a stream of Thuringia, Germany.

The Seebach is formed as the confluence of the two headstreams Mühlbach and Wilder Graben, southeast of Niederdorla. It discharges into the Unstrut in the village Seebach.

See also
List of rivers of Thuringia

References

External links 

Rivers of Thuringia
Rivers of Germany